The 1932 NC State Wolfpack football team was an American football team that represented North Carolina State University as a member of the Southern Conference (SoCon) during the 1932 college football season. In its second season under head coach John "Clipper" Smith, the team compiled a 6–1–2 record (3–1–1 against SoCon opponents), tied for sixth place in the conference, and was outscored by a total of 97 to 29.

Schedule

References

NC State
NC State Wolfpack football seasons
NC State Wolfpack football